The World Junior Alpine Skiing Championships 2012 were the 31st World Junior Alpine Skiing Championships, held between 29 February and 9 March 2012 in Roccaraso, Italy.

Medal winners

Men's events

Women's events

Team event

External links
World Junior Alpine Skiing Championships 2012 results at fis-ski.com

World Junior Alpine Skiing Championships
2012 in alpine skiing
Alpine skiing competitions in Italy
2012 in Italian sport
Roccaraso